Englewood is a census-designated place (CDP) in Charlotte and Sarasota counties in the U.S. state of Florida.  As of the 2020 census, it had a population of 20,800. It is part of the Sarasota-Bradenton-Punta Gorda Combined Statistical Area.

History

Archeological digs in what is now Englewood discovered ceramics belonging to both the Weeden Island culture and Safety Harbor culture.

One of the earliest white settlers in the area was a man named William Goff, who arrived by schooner from Tampa in 1878. He settled a piece of land just a few miles south of where Englewood would be platted. On July 3, 1895, a post office was established in the area as well. The original plat of Englewood was recorded and filed on August 17, 1896. The area was developed by three brothers, and the name Englewood came from their hometown, Englewood, Chicago. Some of the street, such as Dearborn, Harvard, and Yale, are from Chicago. The Great Freeze of 1894 and 1895, along with a bad freeze in 1896, led to the decimation of many local orange plants. For this reason, by 1897, a Manatee County General Directory listed fish as the chief product for Englewood. In 1898, the Englewood Inn was opened, a relatively large hotel with 16 rooms. The hotel serviced visitors from up north until it burned down in 1909.

In 1921, both Sarasota and Charlotte County were created. Englewood, which was initially more on the modern Sarasota side of the county line, would eventually expand to its current size that now resides in both counties.

Geography

Demographics

As of the 2000 U.S. Census, there were 16,196 people, 8,291 households, and 5,206 families in the CDP. The racial makeup of the CDP was 98.25% White, 0.19% African American, 0.25% Native American, 0.36% Asian, 0.01% Pacific Islander, 0.40% from other races, and 0.54% from two or more races. Hispanic or Latino of any race were 1.49% of the population.

Of the 8,291 households 10.7% had children under the age of 18 living with them, 55.4% were married couples living together, 5.3% had a female householder with no husband present, and 37.2% were non-families. Of households, 32.0% were one person and 21.7% were one person aged 65 or older.  The average household size was 1.94 and the average family size was 2.36.

The age distribution was 10.3% under the age of 18, 3.2% from 18 to 24, 14.1% from 25 to 44, 26.0% from 45 to 64, and 46.4% 65 or older.  The median age was 63 years. For every 100 females, there were 88.7 males.  For every 100 females age 18 and over, there were 86.9 males.

The median household income was $31,808, the median family income was $38,978. Males had a median income of $26,568 versus $21,242 for females. The per capita income for the CDP was $23,462.  About 5.5% of families and 8.7% of the population were below the poverty line, including 17.8% of those under age 18 and 4.9% of those age 65 or over.

Education
The Englewood Community Redevelopment Area (CRA) is a special district created by the Sarasota County Board of County Commissioners in 1999 on the Sarasota side of Englewood. The Sarasota and Charlotte County School Districts have an interlocal agreement allowing some Charlotte County residents to use the Englewood Elementary School and the Sarasota County students to use the Middle and High School located in Charlotte County. Englewood has a private utility company, the Englewood Water District, and the Englewood Fire District that serve the community.

Englewood contains multiple public elementary schools and one public high school (Lemon Bay High School). Several private schools are also located within Englewood.  Englewood Christian Academy, Heritage Christian Academy, and Genesis Christian Academy offer grades K–12. L.A. Ainger Middle School, a public school serving grades 6–8, located in nearby Rotonda West, Florida, is the nearest public middle school.

Popular entertainment includes the beach, restaurants, and a small shopping district located primarily along Dearborn Street.

References

External links

 Englewood Area Chamber of Commerce
 History of Englewood, Florida

1890s establishments in Florida
Census-designated places in Charlotte County, Florida
Census-designated places in Florida
Census-designated places in Sarasota County, Florida
Former municipalities in Florida
Populated places established in the 1890s
Populated places on the Intracoastal Waterway in Florida
Sarasota metropolitan area